Oreopoa is a genus of flowering plants belonging to the family Poaceae. It contains a single species, Oreopoa anatolica.

Its native range is Turkey.

References

Pooideae
Monotypic Poaceae genera